The 1972 Pacific Southwest Open – Men's doubles was an event of the 1972 Pacific Southwest Open tennis tournament and was played on outdoor hard courts at the Los Angeles Tennis Center in Los Angeles, California, in the United States, between September 18 and September 24, 1970. John Alexander and Phil Dent were the defending Pacific Southwest Open doubles champions but were defeated in the quarterfinals. Unseeded Jimmy Connors and Pancho Gonzales won the title by defeating unseeded Ismail El Shafei and Brian Fairlie in the final, 6–3, 7–6.

Seeds

Draw

Finals

Top half

Section 1

Section 2

Bottom half

Section 3

Section 4

References

Los Angeles Open (tennis)
Pacific Southwest Open
Pacific Southwest Open